The Round Top Antiques Fair is a large antiques show held thrice annually in Round Top, Texas. Started in 1968, the show features country, Americana, and European country and formal furniture accessories. Each show lasts a week. The show incorporates three surrounding towns around Roundtop as well, including Burton, Tx, Warrenton Tx, and Carmine Tx.

The Fair has several major venues: The Arbors, Marburger Farm, The Big Red Barn, The Halles, and The Compound. In addition to the venues, the festival is also situated around the town of Round top which features a multitude of restaurants, bars, and shops located in both Henkel and Rummel square.

The Winter Antique Show in January was added a few years ago.

No shows were held in 2020.

Roundtop venues
 -The Halles
 -Marburger Farm
 -The Big Red Barn
 -The Arbors
 -Junk Gypsy World Head quarters
 -The Compound
 -Cisco Home
 -Bader Ranch at Round Top
 -Round Top Antiques & Design Center
 -Blue Hills

Carmine venues
 -Carmine Dance Hall
 -Big Red Barn

Warrenton Venues
 -Cole’s Antique Show
 -Ex-cess I&II
 -Bar W Field
 -Zapp Hall
 -Recycling the Past
 -Antiques & vintage Texas

Notable Restaurants 

Burton
 -Neon Moon Coffee
 -Blue Willow Cafe
 -Brazos Belle Restaurant 
 -Los Patrones Mexican Grill

Round Top
 -Teagues Tavern
 -Royers Cafe
 -Roundtop coffee shop
 -Poppy Burger
 -Manditos Mexican Cantina
 -Stone Cellar Bar
 -Duo Modern: The Restaurant at Market   Hill
 -Lulu’s
 -The Garden Co - Feed & Firewater

Notable Bars
 
Round Top
 -Ellis Motel
 -Heh! remember when? Dance Hall
 -Il Cuculo at Lulu’s
 -The Stone Cellar and Dance Hall
 -The Vintage Hideaway
 -Prost Wine Bar
 -The Garden Co.-Feed & Firewater
 -Teagues Tavern
 -Kooper Family Whiskey Co. and Tasting Room
 

Notable Breweries
 -Brazos valley Brewing Co.
 -Huff Brewing Co.
 -La Grange Brewing Co.
 -Round Top Brewing
 -The Meadery

Notable Wineries
 -Blissful Folly
 -Blue Mule
 -Busted Oak Cellars
 -Pleasant Hill
 -Rosemary’s Vineyard
 -Saddlehorn
 -Windy Winery

References

External links
Round Top Chamber of Commerce
 Blue Hills at Round Top
 AntiqueWeekend directory website
 The Big Red Barn

Festivals in Texas
Tourist attractions in Fayette County, Texas
Antiques shows in the United States
1968 establishments in Texas
Recurring events established in 1968